James Tormé (born August 13, 1973) is a jazz vocalist based in Los Angeles, California. He is the son of American singer Mel Tormé and British actress Janette Scott and grandson of Thora Hird.  After winning the Chuck Niles Jazz Music Award in 2007 and having released two independent CDs, he signed with KOCH records (now E1) in 2008. His debut album was released June 2011.

Notes

References

External links
James Tormé Official Site

1973 births
Living people
20th-century American male singers
20th-century American singers
21st-century American male singers
21st-century American singers
American jazz singers
American people of English descent
People from Los Angeles
Jazz musicians from California